Samuel Jarvis (December 27, 1720 – September 1, 1780) was the father of William Jarvis, head of the Jarvis family in what is now Toronto, Ontario.

Life and career
Jarvis was born in Stamford, Connecticut, to Captain Samuel Jarvis, an American Loyalist, and Naomi Griffin. Jarvis served as long-time town clerk of Stamford, and he was forced to resign due to his loyalty to the British in 1760.

After fleeing Connecticut, Jarvis joined the British Army and became a brigadier general, commanding a Loyalist regiment. Captured and imprisoned in 1778, Jarvis was freed, but he was no longer useful to the British. He later fled with wife Martha Seymour and some of his family to Saint John, New Brunswick. Out of work and with no pension for his military service, Jarvis became a surveyor and searcher. He died in 1780 in Saint John, New Brunswick.

References

External links
 Personal Sheet - Samuel Jarvis
 

1720 births
1780 deaths
Loyalists in the American Revolution from Connecticut
People from Stamford, Connecticut
United Empire Loyalists